Ihar Anatol'evich Maystrenka (born 21 November 1959) is a Belarusian former rower who competed for the Soviet Union in the 1980 Summer Olympics.

In 1980 he was a crew member of the Soviet boat which won the bronze medal in the eights event.

External links
 

1959 births
Living people
Belarusian male rowers
Soviet male rowers
Olympic rowers of the Soviet Union
Rowers at the 1980 Summer Olympics
Olympic bronze medalists for the Soviet Union
Olympic medalists in rowing
Medalists at the 1980 Summer Olympics
World Rowing Championships medalists for the Soviet Union